The 1898 Nevada State Sagebrushers football team was an American football team that represented Nevada State University (now known as the University of Nevada, Reno) as an independent during the 1898 college football season. In its first and only season under head coach F. F. Ellis, the team compiled a 4–1 record.

Schedule

References

Nevada State
Nevada Wolf Pack football seasons
Nevada State Sagebrushers football